Luther Alaner Farrell (July 13, 1893 – December, 1956), nicknamed "Red", was an American baseball pitcher in the Negro leagues. He played from 1919 to 1934 with several teams, playing mostly for the Bacharach Giants.

Farrell played for the 1926 and 1927 Bacharach Giants that were champions of the Eastern Colored League and played in the 1926 and 1927 Colored World Series that the Bacharach Giants lost to the Chicago American Giants both years. In 1926, he mostly played right field, and in Game 1 of the series he hit a home run in the bottom of the seventh inning that tied the game. The game ended in a 3–3 tie when it was called on account of darkness after nine innings. In 1927 Farrell was primarily a pitcher, and he pitched in five games in the Colored World Series, starting four of them, with a 2–2 record. In Game 5 he pitched a 7-inning complete game and didn't allow any hits for what is sometimes called a "shortened no-hitter"; the game was called due to darkness after 7 innings. The Bacharach Giants won 3–2, with the American Giants scoring two unearned runs.

References

External links
 and Baseball-Reference Black Baseball stats and Seamheads

1893 births
1956 deaths
Indianapolis ABCs players
New York Black Yankees players
Bacharach Giants players
St. Louis Giants players
Baseball players from Florida
20th-century African-American sportspeople
Baseball pitchers